Lars Lagerborg (born 27 March 1967) is a Swedish wrestler. He competed in the men's Greco-Roman 68 kg at the 1988 Summer Olympics.

References

External links
 

1967 births
Living people
Swedish male sport wrestlers
Olympic wrestlers of Sweden
Wrestlers at the 1988 Summer Olympics
People from Varberg
Sportspeople from Halland County